Samson Kayode Olaleye (born 6 October 1988), is a Nigerian-Vietnamese footballer who plays as a striker for Hồ Chí Minh City. Samson is the V.League 1's all-time top scorer.

Career
Samson started his playing in Vietnam for Than Quảng Ninh. He scored 15 goals in his two years at the club. In 2009, he joined Đồng Tháp and later became one of the most popular foreign players in Vietnam. He scored 17 goals in 18 games in the 2011 season.

In August 2011, after being liquidated by Đồng Tháp ahead of time due to a hand injury, Kayode moved to Atlético Madrid on a free transfer. He was then loaned to Braga because Atlético had run out of quotas to sign non-EU players.

However, as soon as they learned that Atlético Madrid signed a contract with Samson, the representative of Hanoi had a file submitted to the VFF requesting not to issue an International Transfer Certificate (ITC) for the Nigerian striker because he had previously submitted a certificate to him. Then, Samson finally agreed to sign a memorandum of understanding to play for the capital team from the 2012 season with a part of the transfer money and a compensation clause in case of any violation.

From the 2018 season, teams in the top two divisions of Thailand allow teams to register a foreign player of Southeast Asian (ASEAN) origin in the squad. Buriram United quickly reached an agreement with Hoàng Vũ Samson at the end of December 2017. However, he and his club ended their contract shortly after.

Returning to Hanoi, Hoàng Vũ Samson is still trusted by coach Chu Dinh Nghiem. At this team, the 30-year-old has scored 21 goals in the 2018-2019 season. In 2019, Hoàng Vũ Samson played for Quang Nam, scoring 7 goals in 12 matches. From the 2020 season, the Nigerian-born player was borrowed by Dong A Thanh Hoa, he scored 9 goals in 22 matches until March 31, 2021.

Statistics

Honours
Hà Nội
V.League 1: 2013, 2016, 2018; Runner-up 2012, 2014, 2015
Vietnamese National Cup: Runner-up 2012, 2015, 2016, 2019
Vietnamese Super Cup: 2019; Runner-up 2014, 2016, 2017

Individuals
Top goalscorer V.League 1: 2013, 2014

References 

1988 births
Living people
Association football forwards
Nigerian footballers
Nigerian expatriate footballers
Expatriate footballers in Vietnam
Naturalized citizens of Vietnam
V.League 1 players
Than Quang Ninh FC players
Hanoi FC players
S.C. Braga players
Vietnamese people of Nigerian descent
Dong Thap FC players
Sportspeople from Kaduna